Daniel Smith may refer to:

Entertainment
 Daniel Smith (artist), American painter
 Daniel Arthur Smith (born 1968), American science fiction writer
 Daniel Browning Smith (born 1979), American television actor
 Daniel Wayne Smith (1986–2006), American actor and son of Anna Nicole Smith

Sports
 Daniel Smith (goalkeeper) (fl. 1923), football player for Port Vale
 Daniel Smith (footballer, born 1982), English footballer
 Daniel Smith (Australian cricketer) (born 1982)
 Daniel Smith (South African cricketer)
 Daniel Smith (rugby league) (born 1993), rugby league player
 Daniel Smith (swimmer) (born 1991), Australian 
 Daniel Smith (Filipino cricketer) (born 1992), Filipino cricketer

Other
 Daniel Smith (art materials), art supply manufacturer and retailer
 Daniel Smith (surveyor) (1748–1818), American surveyor, soldier, and senator
 Daniel B. Smith (1792–1883), American educator and pharmacist
 Daniel Bennett Smith (born 1956), United States Secretary of State
 Daniel Wakefield Smith (born 1973), American photojournalist
 Daniel Smith (writer) (born 1977), American journalist
 Daniel W. Smith (philosopher) (born 1958), American philosopher, academic, researcher, and translator
 P. Daniel Smith, United States government administrator

See also
 
 Dan Smith (disambiguation)
 Danny Smith (disambiguation)